Measure for Measure is the fourth studio album by Australian rock/synth-pop band Icehouse, released on 21 April 1986 in Australia by Regular Records and in the United States by Chrysalis Records. It was one of the first three albums to be recorded entirely digitally.

Recording
Frontman Iva Davies said the album was the first time he had worked with producers he could "get on with" and also the first time they had a surplus of songs to choose from. "We've actually got more songs than we'll ever be able to use. It's very strange. It's created problems because they've all turned out really well and I'm loathe to give anything away." "No Promises" and "Regular Boys" are re-recorded tracks that were originally from Boxes.

Release and critical reception
The album, which peaked at number eight in Australia, features the singles "No Promises", "Baby, You're So Strange", "Mr. Big", "Cross the Border" and "Paradise". "No Promises" had been released as a 7-inch vinyl single in October 1985, it peaked at number 30 on the Australian singles chart. It was used for the Boxes ballet created by Icehouse members Iva Davies and Robert Kretschmer together with Sydney Dance Company's choreographer Graeme Murphy, Davies and Kretschmer performed the score with guest percussionist Masaki Tanazawa.

Both "No Promises" and "Cross the Border" were remixed and released as 12-inch singles, and while a major US pop hit would elude them until the following year, "No Promises" went Top 10 on both the Billboard Rock tracks and Dance / Club charts. "Cross the Border" did not see as much club play in the US, but was a Top 20 rock hit there. In Australia, the two further singles lifted from the album, "Baby, You're So Strange" and "Mr. Big", both reached the top 20, higher than the Australian chartings of the singles which achieved international success. "Paradise" was released as a late 1986 US / UK single but achieved no notable chart success in either market.

There are various versions of this album; the Australian and American releases each feature different artwork and track running order while the 2002 Australian remastered version features bonus tracks.

Track listing

Personnel
Credited to:

Icehouse
 Iva Davies – vocals, guitar, keyboards (Fairlight CMI), drum programming, bass guitar
 Simon Lloyd – reeds, brass, trumpet, keyboard programming, Fairlight
 Robert Kretschmer – guitar
 Guy Pratt – bass guitar, fretless bass guitar
 Andy Qunta – keyboards, backing vocals
 Steve Jansen – drums, percussion (on "No Promises", "Cross The Border" and "The Flame")
 Masaki Tanazawa – drums, percussion

Additional musicians
 Brian Eno – backing vocals, piano, keyboards
 Stuart Gordon – strings
 Maurice Green – backing vocals
 Gasper Lawal – percussion
 David Lord – keyboards, string arrangement, percussion
 Shena Power – female voices
 Glen Tommey – percussion

Recording
 Engineer – Rhett Davies, David Lord, Andy Lyden, Iva Davies, Warne Livesey
 Assistant – George Shilling, Matt Howe
 Mastering – Paul Ibbotson
 Mixing – David Hemmings, Warne Livesey, Glen Tommey
 Assistant – Raine Shine
 Producer – Rhett Davies (2,3,4,7,10,11,12), David Lord (1,4,6,8,9)
 Digital remastering (2002) – Iva Davies, Ryan Scott

Artwork
 Brett Cabot – Cover Photography
 David McKenzie – Artwork

Charts

Weekly charts

Year-end charts

Certifications

References

Bibliography

External links

1986 albums
Albums produced by Rhett Davies
Chrysalis Records albums
Icehouse (band) albums
Regular Records albums